The San Jacinto River flows through southeast Texas. It is named after Saint Hyacinth. In the past, it was home to the Karankawa and Akokisa tribes. 

The river begins with a west and east fork; the west fork begins in Walker County, to the west of Huntsville, and flows southeast through Montgomery County, where it is dammed to create Lake Conroe. The east fork begins in San Jacinto County, a few miles west of Lake Livingston, then flows south through Cleveland. The confluence of the west and east forks occurs in northeast Harris County, where the river is dammed to create Lake Houston. Continuing southward, the river merges with Buffalo Bayou before the mouth of Galveston Bay, forming part of the Houston Ship Channel.  

The Battle of San Jacinto was fought near the rain-swollen Buffalo Bayou in what is now Harris County during the 1836 Texas Revolution. The decisive victory gave rise to the Republic of Texas. The site is now a state historic park. The park is the site of the San Jacinto Monument.

In October 1994, flooding along the San Jacinto River led to the failure of eight petroleum-products pipelines, and the undermining of a number of other pipelines. The escaping products were ignited, leading to smoke inhalation and/or burn injuries of 547 people.

In 2008, the U.S. Environmental Protection Agency (EPA) added the San Jacinto River waste pits to the federal Superfund cleanup list.

In 2017, flooding related to Hurricane Harvey damaged the protective barrier at the San Jacinto River Waste Pits site, releasing dioxins into the river. The EPA ordered International Paper and McGinnis Industrial Maintenance Corp to pay $115 million to clean up the contaminated site.

See also

List of rivers of Texas

References

External links
 
 

Rivers of Texas
Rivers of Houston
Galveston Bay Area